Civic Sardinia (abbr. SC) is a political party active in Sardinia, led by Franco Cuccureddu.

History
Civic Sardinia is a civic movement founded at the end of 2018 by the Mayor of Castelsardo and former regional councilor for the MPA Franco Cuccureddu.

The party participated in the 2019 Sardinian regional election within the centre-right coalition, in support of Christian Solinas' candidacy, and obtained 1.63% of the votes and one seat (assigned to Roberto Caredda).

In the municipal elections of 2019, the lists promoted by Civic Sardinia obtained 1.7% of the votes and no seats in Cagliari (within the centre-right coalition in support of Paolo Truzzu) and 7.9% of the votes and six seats in Sassari (within a coalition of civic lists in support of Nanni Campus). Both party-backed candidates were elected mayors. At the end of 2021 the party will finally break relations with Nanni Campus and the rest of the majority in the city council.

In January 2020 Antonio Nicolini (leader of Union of Sardinians), Franco Cuccureddu (leader of Civic Sardinia) and Gianfranco Scalas (leader of Fortza Paris) met to define the establishment of a Coordination aimed at the realization of a joint political action, in view of the next municipal elections.

in March 2022 Roberto Caredda left the party to found a new party, Idea Sardinia, together with Carla Cuccu and Giovanni Antonio Satta (a party that passed to the opposition of the regional government in July of the same year).

Electoral results

Sardinian regional elections

References

Political parties in Sardinia
Political parties established in 2018
2018 establishments in Italy